is a Japanese politician of the Liberal Democratic Party, a member of the House of Representatives in the Diet (national legislature). A native of Minamiakita District, Akita and graduate of Chuo University, he was elected to the assembly of Akita Prefecture for the first time in 1975 and to the House of Representatives for the first time in 1986.

References

External links 
  in Japanese.

Members of the House of Representatives (Japan)
Chuo University alumni
Living people
1938 births
Liberal Democratic Party (Japan) politicians
21st-century Japanese politicians